Gennady Utenkov (born 1 May 1960) is a Soviet swimmer. He competed in the men's 200 metre breaststroke at the 1980 Summer Olympics.

References

External links
 

1960 births
Living people
Soviet male breaststroke swimmers
Olympic swimmers of the Soviet Union
Swimmers at the 1980 Summer Olympics
Place of birth missing (living people)
Universiade bronze medalists for the Soviet Union
Medalists at the 1983 Summer Universiade
Universiade medalists in swimming